George B. Stallings Jr. (May 12, 1918 – September 30, 2018) was a lawyer, politician, and centenarian in the American state of Florida. He served in the Florida House of Representatives from 1959 to 1968, representing the 20th district.

Early life 
Stallings was born May 12, 1918 in Jacksonville, Florida. He was born to George B. Stallings Sr. and Carolyn Dohme Stallings. As a youth he attended The Bolles School. He was a part of the second admitting class. After graduating he attended the University of Virginia, while in his senior year he was drafted. He enlisted with the Army Air Corps on March 3, 1941. After nine months of training at MacDill Air Force Base he became a commissioned officer. He served as a flight instructor teaching pilots how to fly the B-24 Liberator. He obtained the rank of Captain while in the service.

Career 
Stallings started practicing law after graduating from the University of Florida. He was an attorney for 38 years. He was elected to the 20th district of the Florida House of Representatives, he served from 1959 to 1968. While in office, he was head of the Judiciary Committee. After retiring from the legislator, he served as the general counsel of the Florida Retail Federation. He lobbied 13 years for them.

Personal life 
Stallings first marriage was to a woman named Marguerite Hamilton, a war widow, in 1946. They had 3 daughters together: Ann, Margo, and Debbie. Hamilton died in 1984. Stallings later remarried to Martha Ullmann on November 25, 1995.

References

1918 births
2018 deaths
Democratic Party members of the Florida House of Representatives
American centenarians
Men centenarians